Akhil Bharatiya Vidyarthi Parishad (ABVP) is a right-wing all India student organisation affiliated to the Hindu nationalist organization Rashtriya Swayamsevak Sangh (RSS).

History
The ABVP, founded in 1948 with the initiative of the RSS activist Balraj Madhok, was formally registered on 9 July 1949. Its purpose when founded was to counter communist influence on university campuses. Yashwant Rao Kelkar, a lecturer in Bombay, became its main organiser in 1958. According to the ABVP website, he built the organisation into what it is now and is considered to be 'the real architect of the ABVP'.

Various branches of the ABVP have been involved in Hindu-Muslim communal riots since 1961. However, in the 1970s, the ABVP also increasingly took on issues concerning the lower middle classes like corruption and government inertia. The ABVP played a leading role in the agitational politics of the 1970s during the JP Movement. This led to collaboration among student activists in Gujarat and Bihar. The ABVP gained significantly from such efforts after the Emergency and experienced a growth in membership.

By 1974, the ABVP had 160,000 members across 790 campuses and had gained control over several prominent universities, including University of Delhi via student elections. By 1983, the organisation had 250,000 members and 1,100 branches. ABVP grew during the 1990s, receiving more support as a result of the Babri Masjid demolition and the economic liberalisation pursued by the P. V. Narasimharao government. It continued to grow after the United Progressive Alliance came to power in 2003, trebling in membership to 3.175 million members as of 2016. It claims to be India's largest student organisation.

Links to the BJP
The ABVP spokesmen insist that the ABVP is not affiliated to the Bharatiya Janata Party (BJP). They describe it the "student wing" of the RSS. However, both the BJP and the ABVP are members of the Sangh Parivar, the RSS's "family of (affiliated) organisations". The BJP is said to gain handsomely from the ABVP's support base and several politicians of the BJP, including the former Finance Minister Arun Jaitley, had their ideological foundation in the ABVP. Several scholars make no distinction between the RSS and the BJP, and regard the ABVP as a student wing of both of them or either of them.

In 2017, the ABVP faced a string of losses in student body elections. They included not only Delhi's Jawaharlal Nehru University and Delhi University, but also the Allahabad University and Mahatma Gandhi Kashi Vidyapeeth in Uttar Pradesh, the Gujarat University and the Gauhati University. The loss in the Kashi Vidyapeeth was considered especially significant since it is in Varanasi, the prime minister Narendra Modi's home constituency. This is said to have caused alarm in the BJP, which set up a committee to study the issues causing the ABVP's decline.
ABVP was able to resurge in the year 2018 by winning the key posts of president, vice-president and joint secretary of students polls of Delhi University. ABVP won all the six seats in the Hyderabad Central University students union polls after eight years.

Activities
The ABVP's manifesto includes agendas such as educational and university reforms. It competes in student-body elections in colleges and universities. Students for Development (SFD) is an initiative by the ABVP to promote "right perspective towards the need of holistic and sustainable development" in students. The official ABVP magazine is Rashtriya Chhatrashakti, which is published monthly in Hindi in New Delhi.

Violence
ABVP has been accused to multiple violent incidents, including stone pelting, arson, vandalism and physical assault, on college and school campuses and elsewhere, even leading to the victims' deaths in some cases. Most notably, on 5 January 2020, according to the Jawaharlal Nehru University Students' Union, masked ABVP members attacked JNU students, smashing cars and pelted stones, while ABVP accused left wing organisations. ABVP later confessed the same on national media and in a sting operation, and the veracity of ABVP's involvement was also found out through investigative journalism which was later confirmed by Delhi Police. A total of 28 people were injured, including students and teachers.

Initiatives

Mission Sahasi 
ABVP conducts self-defense training program for girls titled "Mission Sahasi" all over India.

Mission Aarogya 
ABVP conducted door-to-door screening in more than 100 slums of Delhi for Covid-19 symptoms and encouraged people to register for vaccination.

References

Further reading

External links
 

 
Anti-communist organizations
Anti-communism in India
Anti-Islam sentiment in India
Sangh Parivar
Student organisations in India
Hindu nationalism
Hindu organizations
1948 establishments in Bombay State
Student wings of political parties in India
Student organizations established in 1948